Stefan Lambov Danailov (9 December 1942 – 27 November 2019) was a Bulgarian actor who served as Minister of Culture of Bulgaria (August 2005 – July 2009).

The first film Danailov took part in was The Traces Remain when he was a child. At that time he did not want to be an actor but in 1966, he graduated from VITIZ (the Bulgarian Theatre Academy). His best-known work was as Major Deyanov in the series  (At Each Kilometer). He participated in numerous films and plays for which he won a lot of prizes. For 20 years he was a professor at the Theatre Academy in Sofia, teaching there since 1988.

On 2 December 2019, The Bulgarian National Theater organized the biggest memorial service in Stefan Danailov's name.

Selected filmography

 The Traces Remain (1956) - Veselin
 The Inspector and the Night (1963) - Tom
 Quiet Paths (1967)
 The Sea (1967) - Toni
 Taste of Almonds (1967) - Belokozhev
 The First Courier (1968) - Zagubanski
 At Each Kilometer (1969, TV Series) - Nikola Deyanov
 The Prince (1970) - Knyaz Svetoslav
 The Black Angels (1970) - Panter
 There is Nothing Finer Than Bad Weather (1971) - Lyubo
 At Each Kilometer-II (1971, TV Series) - Nikola Deyanov
 Affection (1972) - Nikolay
 Nona (1973) - Poruchik Galchev
 Ivan Kondarev (1974) - Kostadin Dzhupunov
 Houses Without Fences (1974) - Kerkeneza
 Glow over Drava (1974) - Poruchik Bozhev
 Life or Death (1974, TV Movie) - D-r Milev
 The Weddings of King Ioan Assen (1975) - Burgundetza
 Tozi istinski mazh (1975) - Sasho
 Nachaloto na denya (1975) - Andrey Stoychev
 Guilt (1976) - Zhivko Georgiev
 Samodivsko horo (1976)
 Vinata (1976) - Zhivko Topalov
 Dopalnenie kam zakona za zashtita na darzhavata (1976) - Kapitanat provokator
 Godina ot ponedelnitzi (1977) - Inzhener Halachev
 RMS Five (1977, TV Series)
 Yuliya Vrevskaya (1978) - Karabelov
 Dying in the worst case (") (1978) - Dzho Rayt
 Oncomming Traffic (1978, TV Movie) - Chavdar Bonev
 Toplo (1978) - Workman / Gyp
 Migove v kibritena kutiyka (1979) - Kvartirantat
 Something Out of Nothing (От нищо нещо) (1979) - Pancho
 Voynata na taralezhite (1979)
 Ladies' Choice (1980) - Vasil Gramatikov
 Blood Remains (1980) - Yakim (the driving instructor)
 The Queen of Tarnovo (1981) - D-r Stariradev
 Autumn Sun (1982) - Kiril Dechev
 Crystals (1982) - Cholakov
 Twenty-four Hours Raining (1982) - Kapitan Vasil Altunov
 Edna odiseya v Deliormana (1983) - Ofitzer Ivanov
 Ravnovesie (1983) - Aktyora
 Aris (1983)
 Tazi krav tryabvashe da se prolee (1985) - Yuvigi han
 The Conversion to Christianity & Discourse of Letters (1985) - Boris I
 Maneuvers On the Fifth Floor (1985) - Danton Tahov
 Coasts in the Mist (1986) - Sokrat
 Transport of Death (1986) - Mitropolit Kiril
 Three Marias and Ivan (1986) - Ivan
 Poema (1986) - Anton Cholakov
 Dreamers (1987) - Nachalnikat na politziyata
 Nebe za vsichki (1987) - Velikov-Slantzeto
 Ne se motay v krakata mi (1987)
 Levakat (1987) - Kapitan Hristo Pashov
 Zashtitete drebnite zhivotni (1988)
 Monday Morning (1988) - Krastyo
 Big Game (1988, TV Mini-Series)
 Zapadnya (1988)
 The Carnival (1990) - Konstantinov
 Live Dangerously (1990)
 Iskam Amerika (1991) - Rezhisyorat Paskalev
 The Berlin Conspiracy (1992) - Actor
 Crisis in the Kremlin (1992) - Ambrazis
 Don Quixote is Coming Back (1997) - Duke
 Ispanska muha (1998) - Uycho
 Sled kraja na sveta (1998) - Albert Cohen (Berto)
 A Spanish Fly (1998)
 After the End of World (1998) - Albert Cohen (Berto)
 Druids (2001)
 Forgive Us (2003, TV Movie) - Chicho Petyo
 La Masseria Delle Allodole (2007) - Presidente Tribunale
 St. George Shoots the Dragon (2009) - Minta Ciganin
 Staklenata reka (2010)
 Incognita (2012) - Director of the Foundation
 Reunion (2019) - Grandfather (final film role)

External links

 

1942 births
2019 deaths
Bulgarian male film actors
Male actors from Sofia
Ministers of Culture of Bulgaria
Bulgarian Socialist Party politicians
Place of birth missing
Bulgarian actor-politicians